Sarab Talkh (also Romanized as Sarāb-e Talkh and Sarāb Talkh) is a village in Robat Rural District, in the Central District of Khorramabad County, Lorestan Province, Iran. At the 2006 census, its population was 115, in 26 families.

References 

Towns and villages in Khorramabad County